Charles Cléry (29 December 1873 – 12 May 1917) was a French fencer. He competed in the men's masters épée event at the 1900 Summer Olympics.

References

External links
 

1873 births
1917 deaths
French male épée fencers
Olympic fencers of France
Fencers at the 1900 Summer Olympics
Sportspeople from Nord (French department)